Ostrosky is a surname. Notable people with the surname include:

 Beth Ostrosky Stern (born 1972), American actress, author, model, and animal rights activist
 David Ostrosky (born 1954), Mexican actor